The BBC National Orchestra of Wales (BBC NOW) is a Welsh symphony orchestra and one of the BBC's five professional radio orchestras. The BBC NOW is the only professional symphony orchestra organisation in Wales, occupying a dual role as both a broadcasting orchestra and national orchestra. The BBC NOW has its administrative base in Cardiff, at the BBC Hoddinott Hall on the site of the Wales Millennium Centre, since January 2009.

The BBC NOW is the orchestra-in-residence at St David's Hall, Cardiff, and also performs regularly throughout Wales and beyond, including international tours and annual appearances at the Royal Albert Hall in London at the BBC Proms. Broadcasting work includes studio sessions for BBC Radio and television, although the orchestra's concerts form the bulk of its broadcasts, transmitted primarily on BBC Radio 3 but also on BBC Radio Wales, BBC Radio Cymru and BBC television. The orchestra records many soundtracks for BBC television, including Doctor Who, Torchwood, Human Planet,  and Earthflight.

History
 
The precursor ensemble of the BBC NOW was the Cardiff Station Orchestra, which was founded in 1924 and had developed into the National Orchestra of Wales by 1928. Funding problems resulted in the disbandment of this orchestra in 1931. In 1935, the BBC Welsh Orchestra was established as a 20-member ensemble, but the orchestra was dissolved with the advent of the Second World War in 1939. After the war, the BBC Welsh Orchestra was revived as a 31-member ensemble, with Mansel Thomas as its first principal conductor. In 1947, the BBC Welsh Chorus was founded as the affiliate chorus of the orchestra. The orchestra's ensemble size increased steadily, reaching 44 musicians in the 1960–1961 season, 60 musicians in 1974, and 66 musicians in 1976, when the orchestra's name was changed to the BBC Welsh Symphony Orchestra. It reached a full symphonic complement of 88 players in 1987 before being reduced to its current level of 78 players in 2014 as part of BBC savings delivered by Director at the time, Michael Garvey, who also made reductions to the administrative and management team through redundancies. In the 1970s, a new chorus to supplant the former BBC Welsh Chorus, the BBC Welsh Choral Society, was established. In 1993, the orchestra was renamed the BBC National Orchestra of Wales, to reflect more suitably its special role as both a national orchestra and a BBC Performing Group. In parallel, the chorus was renamed the BBC National Chorus of Wales. Both the orchestra and the chorus engage in outreach work through their Education and Community Outreach department, which creates access to the players and singers for Welsh schools, groups, communities and musicians of all abilities.

Tadaaki Otaka, principal conductor from 1987 to 1995, is currently the BBC NOW's conductor laureate. Richard Hickox, principal conductor from 2000 to 2006, was the orchestra's conductor emeritus until his death in November 2008.  In July 2011, the BBC NOW announced the appointment of Thomas Søndergård as its 14th principal conductor, effective with the 2012–2013 season, for an initial contract of 4 years.   In February 2016, the BBC NOW announced the further extension of Søndergård's contract as principal conductor through "at least 2018".  Søndergård formally concluded his tenure as principal conductor in July 2018.

Past principal guest conductors have included Mariss Jansons, James Loughran and Jac van Steen. François-Xavier Roth was the past associate guest conductor of the BBC NOW.  In December 2015, the BBC NOW announced the appointment of Xian Zhang as its next principal guest conductor, effective with the 2016–2017 season, with an initial contract of 3 years.  She is the first female conductor named to a titled post with any BBC orchestra.  Past Composers-in-Association have included B Tommy Andersson. Huw Watkins became the BBC NOW's Composer-in-Association, beginning in  2015. In September 2020, Gavin Higgins was announced as the BBC NOW's new composer-in-association.  Adrian Partington is the current artistic director of the BBC National Chorus of Wales.

In November 2018, Ryan Bancroft first guest-conducted the BBC NOW, as an emergency substitute for Xian Zhang.  He returned as guest conductor to the BBC NOW in May 2019.  In September 2019, the BBC NOW announced the appointment of Bancroft as its next chief conductor, effective with the 2020–2021 season, with an initial contract of 3 years.

Previous Directors of the BBC NOW and the BBC National Chorus of Wales have included Huw Tregelles-Williams, David Murray (responsible for the building of Hoddinott Hall) and Michael Garvey.  In September 2019, the BBC announced the appointment of Lisa Tregale as the new Director of the BBC NOW and the BBC National Chorus of Wales, effective in 2020.  Tregale is the first woman to be named to the post.

Discography
In addition to its recording work for the BBC, the BBC National Orchestra of Wales has an extensive commercial discography with such labels as Chandos, Hyperion and Linn.  These include recorded cycles of music of Lennox Berkeley and Michael Berkeley, Frank Bridge, and Edmund Rubbra.

The BBC NOW discography includes:
 Tippett: The Rose Lake; Ritual Dances from The Midsummer Marriage [CHSA 5039]
 Elgar: Symphony No 2; In The South (Alassio) [CHSA 5038]
 Sullivan: Trial by Jury; Cox and Box [CHSA 10321]
 Bridge: Orchestral Works, Vol. 6 [CHAN 10310]
 Walton: Christopher Columbus; Hamlet and Ophelia [CHSA 5034]
 Parry: Works for Chorus and Orchestra [CHAN 10740] – nominated for Best Choral Performance at the 2014 Grammy Awards
 Stravinsky: Ballets Russes
 Holst: Orchestral Works, Vol. 1 [CHSA 5069]

World Premieres
Works premiered by the orchestra include:
 1936 – Grace Williams: Elegy for String Orchestra
 1936 – Arwel Hughes: Fantasia for Strings
 1947 – Grace Williams: "Sea Sketches"
 1950 – Grace Williams: Violin Concerto, soloist Granville Jones
 1950 – David Wynne: Rhapsody Concerto for Violin & Orchestra, soloist Jan Sedivka
 1950 – Alun Hoddinott: Concerto for Clarinet & String Orchestra, soloist Fred Clements
 1953 – David Wynne: Elegy for Solo Violin & Strings, soloist Jan Sedivka
 1955 – David Wynne: Prelude, Air & Dance
 1961 – David Wynne: A Welsh Suite
 1962 – Alun Hoddinott: "Job"
 1964 – David Wynne: Fantasia Concerto for Viola & Orchestra, soloist Geoffrey York
 1965 – David Wynne: Cymric Rhapsody No.1
 1967 – Grace Williams: Carillons, Concertino for Oboe & Orchestra, soloist Philip Jones (oboe)
 1967 – David Wynne: "Octad"
 1968 – David Wynne: Prelude for Orchestra
 1969 – Alun Hoddinott: "Nocturnes & Cadenzas", soloist Raphael Sommer (cello)
 1972 – Alun Hoddinott: "The Hawk Is Set Free"
 1975 – Alun Hoddinott: "Landscapes"
 1978 – Alun Hoddinott: "Voyagers"
 1980 – Alun Hoddinott: "The Heaventree of Stars", soloist Christopher Warren-Green (violin)
 1981 – Alun Hoddinott: "Lanternes Des Morts"
 1984 – Alun Hoddinott: Symphony No.6
 1988 – Alun Hoddinott: "Tarantella", soloist Ieuan Jones (harp)
 1989 – Alun Hoddinott: "Songs of Exile", soloist Robert Tear (tenor)
 1989 – Alun Hoddinott: "Star Children"
 1989 – Alun Hoddinott: Symphony No.7
 1990 – Alun Hoddinott: "Emynau Pantycelyn"
 1993 – Alun Hoddinott: Symphony No.9
 1995 – Alun Hoddinott: Concerto No.2 for Violin & Orchestra, soloist Dong-Suk Kang (violin)
 1996 – Anthony Powers: Symphony No. 1
 1997 – Unsuk Chin: Piano Concerto
 1999 – Alun Hoddinott: Symphony No.10
 2002 – Alun Hoddinott: "Lizard"
 2004 – Alun Hoddinott: "Badger in the Bag" [Broch Ynghod]
 2004 – Alun Hoddinott: Trombone Concerto, soloist Mark Eager
 2007 – Giles Swayne: Symphony No.1 - a small world
 2007 – Alun Hoddinott: "Images of Venice", soloists Helen Field (soprano), Jeremy Huw Williams (baritone)
 2007 – John McCabe: Horn Concerto (Rainforest IV), soloist David Pyatt
 2009 – Alun Hoddinott: "Taliesin"
 2010 – Arvo Pärt: In spe
 2010 – Arlene Sierra: Piano Concerto (Art of War)
 2010 – Simon Holt: Centauromachy, soloists Philippe Schartz (flugelhorn) and Robert Plane (clarinet)
 2011 – Christopher Painter: Furnace of Colours, soloist Claire Booth (soprano)
 2011 – Mark Bowden: lyra
 2013 – Simon Holt: The Yellow Wallpaper
 2015 – B Tommy Andersson: Pan
 2016 – John Pickard: Symphony No 5
 2018 – Huw Watkins: Spring

Principal conductors
 Warwick Braithwaite (1928–1931)
 Reginald Redman (1931–1935)
 Idris Lewis (1935–1939)
 Mansel Thomas (1946–1950)
 Rae Jenkins (1950–1965)
 John Carewe (1966–1971)
 Boris Brott (1972–1978)
 Bryden Thomson (1979–1982)
 Erich Bergel (1983–1985)
 Tadaaki Otaka (1987–1995)
 Mark Wigglesworth (1996–2000)
 Richard Hickox (2000–2006)
 Thierry Fischer (2006–2012)
 Thomas Søndergård (2012–2018)
 Ryan Bancroft (2020–present)

Composers in association
 Michael Berkeley (2001–2008)
 Simon Holt (2008–2014)
 B. Tommy Andersson (2014–2015)
 Huw Watkins (2015–2020)
 Gavin Higgins (2020–present)

Resident composers
 Guto Puw (2006-2010)
 Mark Bowden (2011-2015)
 Sarah Lianne Lewis (Composer Affiliate, 2020–present)

References

Sources
 "The BBC National Orchestra of Wales: A Celebration", Peter Reynolds (BBC, 2009)

External links
 BBC NOW official home page
 BBC NOW page on the history of the orchestra
 BBC review of its performing groups - June 2012

National Orchestra of Wales
British symphony orchestras
Musical groups established in 1928
Music in Cardiff
Radio and television orchestras
Welsh orchestras